Amlahah (also Romanized as Amlaḩah; also known as Amlīḩeh and Melḩeh) is a village in Jaffal Rural District, in the Central District of Shadegan County, Khuzestan Province, Iran. At the 2006 census, its population was 158, in 31 families.

References 

Populated places in Shadegan County